Biomedical Optics Express is a peer-reviewed scientific journal published monthly by the Optical Society. The journal's scope encompasses fundamental research and technology development of optics applied to biomedical studies and clinical applications. It is considered one of the top journals in the field of optics. The founding and first editor-in-chief is Joseph A. Izatt (Duke University). The current editor-in-chief is Ruikang (Ricky) Wang at the University of Washington, USA.

Abstracting and indexing 
The journal is abstracted and indexed by:
 Science Citation Index Expanded
 Current Contents/Engineering, Computing & Technology
 Chemical Abstracts Service/CASSI
 PubMed
According to the Journal Citation Reports, the journal has a 2021 impact factor of 3.562.

References

External links

Optica (society) academic journals
Radiology and medical imaging journals
Optics journals
Open access journals
Monthly journals
Publications established in 2010
English-language journals
Biomedical engineering journals